Maceo is an unincorporated community and census-designated place (CDP) in Daviess County, Kentucky, United States. As of the 2010 census, it had a population of 413.

The community was founded by freed slaves just after the U.S. Civil War.  In 1890, the Louisville, Henderson & St. Louis Railroad company setup a station and post office there named Powers Station, Kentucky, after Col. J.D. Powers.  This name was often confused with another post office named Powers Store, Kentucky.  At the suggestion of Post Master Edwin P. Taylor, the post office was renamed to honor Cuban General Antonio Maceo Grajales in 1897.

Maceo is the hometown of country singer Marty Brown and Keith Payne, the author of The Broken Ladder: How Inequality Affects the Way We Think, Live, and Die.

Geography
U.S. Route 231 diverges from US 60 at Maceo, leading north to cross the Ohio River into Indiana on the William H. Natcher Bridge, which opened in 2002. Maceo has two cemeteries called Kelly Cemetery and Iron Ore Hill Cemetery and a post office with ZIP code 42355.

Demographics

References

Unincorporated communities in Daviess County, Kentucky
Unincorporated communities in Kentucky